Blood on the Face is the seventh studio album by Russian metal band Grenouer. It was released on 3 May 2013 through Mausoleum Records.

Cover 
The cover was created by Didier Scohier/artcore design, who had previously worked with bands like Cinderella and Raven Lord.

Track listing 
All songs written and composed by Grenouer except where noted.

Personnel

Grenouer 
 Andrey "Ind" – Vocals
 Alexander "Motor" – Lead guitar
 Igor "Buzzy" – Guitar
 Dmitry "Daemon" – Bass
 Michael "Coroner" – Drums

Production 
 Dualized (Mixing, Sound Design)
 Eddy Cavazza (Keyboards, Sound Design)
 Anssi Kippo (Keyboards, Bass, Producer)
 Joonas Koto

Reception
Reviewer Martell of "We Löve Metal" commented, "Grenouer has changed their sound in a very mainstream oriented direction that can obtain mass appeal. The music is good and will be appreciated. But…when you keep a name with a history; your fans expect a certain things to come out of their speakers. In the case of Grenouer’s “Blood on the Face” their old fans are going to be shocked at the sharp turn the band has taken. They aren't blatantly selling themselves as death metal, but with the name comes the past and their past is death."

References

External links 
 Grenouer – Blood On The Face Details

2013 albums
Grenouer albums